Annes Elwy (born 7 June 1992) is a Welsh actress, known for her screen roles in both English and Welsh language productions.

Biography
She starred as Beth March in the 2017 BBC adaptation of Little Women.

She was brought up in Penarth, went to school in Barry, and trained at the Royal Welsh College of Music & Drama in Cardiff. In 2018 she was nominated for the Best Actress award at the BAFTA Cymru awards ceremony, losing to Eve Myles. She was nominated as one of Variety'''s "10 to watch".

Her theatre work has included productions of The Crucible at Bristol Old Vic, YEN at the Royal Exchange, Manchester, and No Other Like Today/Diwrnod Heb Ei Debyg with the National Youth Theatre of Wales. Her performance in the 2021 Welsh language horror Gwledd/The Feast has been described as "captivating and magnetic".

She has been critical of the decision to film two versions of some Welsh television programmes in both Welsh and English, saying "it's bizarre ... because we’re so open to watching foreign language productions".

FilmsThe Passing (2015)King Arthur: Excalibur Rising (2017)Gwledd/The Feast (2021)The Toll (2021)

 Television Little Women'' (2017)
Hidden (2018)
Y Golau/The Light in the Hall (2022)

References

External inks 

 

1992 births
21st-century women
People from Penarth
Welsh-speaking actors
Living people